President Assad may refer to:
Hafez al-Assad (1930–2000), 18th president of Syria
Bashar al-Assad (born 1965), 19th president of Syria and son of the 18th president

See also
 Asad (name)
 Assad (disambiguation)